The Huang He Plain mixed forests ecoregion (WWF ID: PA0424) covers the flat lower ranges of the Yellow River ("Huang He" means Yellow River).   This area is generally known as the North China Plain.  While there is some forest habitat, the region has mostly been converted to agriculture, being one of the most populous areas in the world (approximately 190 million people).

Location and description 

The Huang He Mixed Forests ecoregion covers the North China plain, a large alluvial plain which collects the deposits of the lower reaches of the Yellow River, the Huai River, and the Hai River.  The plain is very flat, and averages only 50 meters above sea level.  Almost 3% of the land area is urbanized.

Climate 
The climate of the ecoregion is Humid continental climate, warm summer (Köppen climate classification (Dwb)), with a dry winter.

Flora and fauna 
As of 2012, only 15% of the surface area (about 65,000 km2) of the ecoregion was in its natural state; the majority of the land is devoted to agriculture.   A 2005 conservation study reported that the Huang He ecoregion was only 3.29% covered by protected areas, and that the area is "now so populated and degraded that options for PA [protected area] development are very limited".

See also 
 List of ecoregions in China

References 

Palearctic ecoregions
Ecoregions of China
Temperate broadleaf and mixed forests